The 1875 Massachusetts gubernatorial election was held on November 2, 1875. Incumbent Democratic Governor William Gaston ran for re-election to a second term in office, but was defeated by Republican Alexander H. Rice, a former U.S. Representative and Mayor of Boston.

General election

Results

See also
 1875 Massachusetts legislature

References

Governor
1875
Massachusetts
November 1875 events